Daniel Frank Gerber (May 6, 1898 – March 16, 1974) was an American manufacturer of baby food, and founder of Gerber Food Products. He had a management college education and then started working for his father's canning company in Michigan and became its assistant general manager. Gerber's unhealthy baby daughter become the inspiration for his mass produced baby food. At the time, mass produced baby food was a new concept. Gerber implemented a marketing scheme that developed the local canning company of adult products into a world wide multi-million dollar enterprise of baby products. He eventually became the general manager of Gerber Products Company. Under his leadership, the company experienced large growth.

Early life 

Gerber went by the name "Dan" to his friends and relatives. He was the son of Frank Daniel Gerber and Pauline Dora Platt. He was born in Fremont of Newaygo County, Michigan, on May 6, 1898.

Mid-life 
Gerber  attended St. John's Military Academy from 1913 to 1916. He served in the army during World War I. He then attended the Babson College of business administration from 1919 to 1920. He hired in later in 1920 at Fremont Canning Company, a firm his father owned. He was a successful manager and by 1926 he had become assistant general manager of the company. Along with thirty-five other people registered with the Newaygo County Ku Klux Klan, Gerber was a member of the Fremont Chamber of Commerce.

Gerber and his wife Dorothy had an unhealthy baby named Sally. Their doctor suggested strained foods for her. Dorothy proposed that he persuade his father to begin making and selling at their canning company strained baby foods. He started with strained peas and four other strained foods prepared for babies. Gerber with his father did some extensive research on this new concept. They contacted nutritional experts, distributed many samples, and conducted market research interviews before launching their product.  

The idea of strained baby foods was not entirely new as pharmacies sold it on prescription with prices around 35 cents a can. Gerber and his father planned to sell their product at less than half that cost. The long-held American tradition was that babies generally were given a liquid diet until they were about a year old. It was risky to introduce this new concept to the marketplace as the Gerbers had no idea how mothers would react to this new concept. In 1928, Gerber's canning company started an advertising campaign in Good Housekeeping, Parents Magazine, JAMA Journal, and other magazines. His task was to convince parents to adopt a new feeding concept that he himself was trying on his daughter Sally. 

Gerber introduced a new symbol as part of his marketing scheme, the Gerber Baby. His marketing campaign worked beyond expectations and the first year gross sales were $345,000. Despite the Great Depression the canning company Gerber was managing expanded its baby food lines during the 1930s. The Fremont Canning Company was selling more baby food than adult food by 1941 and Gerber and his father officially changed the name to Gerber Products Company and sold the product worldwide. Gerber had the company stop making adult food completely by 1943 and in the 1950s he opened plants in Oakland, California, Rochester, New York, and Niagara Falls, Ontario.

Later life 

Gerber became the senior member of the canning company when his father died in 1952. He expanded and diversified the company and added a toy line in 1955. In the same year he appeared as a contestant on an episode of the TV quiz program You Bet Your Life and that gave his company free advertising. He had the company listed on the New York Stock Exchange in 1956. He opened a Mexican subsidiary in 1959 and expanded the company into Canada and Europe by 1960. Gerber added a large line of baby-related merchandise in 1965. In 1945 Gerber's company had 2,000 employees and by 1965 the number of employees had nearly tripled.

Personal life 

Gerber's father Frank Gerber, who owned the original Fremont Canning Company, died October 7, 1952, and he then took over management of the company. Gerber and his father both were Christian Scientists and Republicans. Gerber married Dorothy Marion Scott in 1923 and they had five children. His daughter Sally (the unhealthy baby that was the inspiration for mass produced baby food) was engaged to be married in 1948. Gerber died March 16, 1974, and his wife died September 10, 1988. Gerber has 18 grandchildren and 15 great-grandchildren.

References

Sources 

1898 births
1974 deaths
People from Fremont, Michigan
American Ku Klux Klan members
Businesspeople from Michigan